KWWL may refer to:

 KWWL (TV), a television station (channel 7 digital/virtual) licensed to serve Waterloo, Iowa, United States
 KPTY (AM), an AM radio station (1330 AM) licensed to serve Waterloo, Iowa, which held the call sign KWWL from 1947 to 1980
 KFMW, an FM radio station (107.9 FM) licensed to serve Waterloo, Iowa, which previously held the KWWL-FM callsign